UGC NET or NTA-UGC-NET, is the examination for determining the eligibility for the post of assistant professor and/or Junior Research Fellowship award in Indian universities and colleges. The examination is conducted by National Testing Agency on behalf of University Grants Commission. Until July 2018, the Central Board of Secondary Education (CBSE) conducted the UGC NET exam, which the NTA has been conducting since December 2018. Currently, the exam is being conducted twice a year in the months of June and December in online mode.

Jobs for NET qualified candidates
University Grants Commission (UGC) announced in 2013 that the candidates who clear the NET successfully would be eligible for lucrative also for private college lectureship jobs in public sector undertakings (PSUs). PSUs can use UGC-NET scores for the recruitment process of the posts of executives in their organization in disciplines like science (R&D), management, corporate communications, human resources, and finance. This step taken by the UGC would also increase the number of students taking the UGC-NET examination which has witnessed a gradual decline in recent years.

UGC Net Qualifying Criteria And Cut Off Percentages 
UGC NET Procedure and Criteria for the declaration of result steps:

 Obtain minimum qualifying marks with aggregate 55% marks to General and 50% to others in master's degree.
 The paper will be divided into two papers: Papers 1 and 2. The candidates would have to attempt a total of (both papers 1 and 2) 150 questions in three hours.
 There is no separate cutoff for any of the papers and the cutoff is decided on the aggregate marks.
 Amongst those candidates who have obtained Minimum marks a merit list will be prepared subject wise and category-wise using the aggregate marks of two papers secured by such candidates.
 For lectureship, the aggregate cut off marks for General category is between 54 and 60, for OBC NCL it is 49–56, for SC/ST it is 45–54 and for EWS it is 48–58 (for all subjects).
 On the other hand, Top 6% of candidates will be selected for eligibility of NET-Qualified Assistant Professor. Simultaneously, a separate list for JRF would be prepared. 
 A separate merit list for the award of JRF will be prepared from amongst the NET qualified candidates figuring in the above merit list prepared.
 Until 2018 UGC released the certificates but from December 2018 onward, NTA releases the UGC NET e-certificate and JRF award letter on its official website for the qualified candidates. Successful candidates would be able to download their e-certificates and award letters online at ugcnet.nta.nic.in.

Reservations quota in UGC-NET and Junior Research Fellowships 
Candidates clearing JRF exams are also eligible for the National Eligibility Test. UGC follows the Government of India's reservation policy in UGC-NET, as per which a minimum of 27%, 10%, 15%, 7.5% for OBC, EWS, SC, ST respectively and 5% for PWD (Earlier the reservation for Higher Education is 3% , now it is 5 percentage for PWD as per RPWD Act 2016 irrespective of the caste which they belong, Reservation for PWD is for benchmark disability)  

The reservation is applicable for UGC-NET Examination being University Grants Commission comes under Central Education Institution Act under Sec. 2(d)(ii) and National Testing Agency (NTS) comes under Central Education Institution Act under Sec. 2(d)(v).
 
Now as per Rights of Persons with Disabilities Act, 2016  National Testing Agency (NTA) & University Grants Commission (UGC) is obliged to provide 5% reservation to PWD as per Sec. 32(1) of RPWD Act, 2016 to those who are having above 40% disability being NTA is an Educational Agency registered under Societies Registration Act, 1860 and as per Central Educational Institution (Reservation in Admission) Act, 2006 Sec. 2.(d)(v) an educational institution set up by the Central Government under the Societies Registration Act, 1860.

Thereby as per Sec. 32(1) of the RPWD Act, 2016 Differentially abled persons (those who are above 40% disability)  are eligible for 5% reservation in higher education.  As per Central Education Institution (Reservation in Admission) Act, 2006 UGC & NTA is providing the reservation to SC/ST, OBC, General-Economically Weaker Section etc. 

Rights of Persons with Disabilities Act, 2016

32. (1) All Government institutions of higher education and other higher education institutions receiving aid from the Government shall reserve not less than five per cent. seats for persons with benchmark disabilities.

UGC NET Age Limit and Relaxation 
JRF: Candidate should not be more than 31 years as on 1 June 2022. There are a few relaxations as well.
 Candidates (including women applicants) belonging to OBC-NCL/SC/ST/PwD/Transgender categories are provided a relaxation of up to five years.
 Candidates who have research experience get a relaxation limited to the period they have spent on the research, but this relaxation is subject to a maximum of five years, only if you provide a certificate from the appropriate authority.
 Candidates with the degree Master of Laws (L.L.M.) are provided with three years of relaxation in age.
 Candidates who have served in the armed forces are provided with a relaxation of up to five years which is subject to the length of service in the armed forces up to the first day of the month in which the UGC NET examination is to be held.
 Under any circumstances, the total relaxation of the above ground(s) shall not exceed five years.
Assistant Professor: There is no upper age limit for candidates to apply for UGC NET (Assistant Professor).

Number of applicants by year

See also

 List of Public service commissions in India
 List of Public Sector Undertakings in India

References

External links

Standardised tests in India
1989 establishments in India